Simon Alphonse Kirchhoffer (December 19, 1873 in Paris – June 30, 1913 in Paris) was a French fencer who competed in the late 19th century and early 20th century.

He participated in Fencing at the 1900 Summer Olympics in Paris and won the silver medal in the master's foil. He was defeated by Lucien Mérignac in the final.

References

External links 

1873 births
1913 deaths
French male foil fencers
Olympic silver medalists for France
Olympic fencers of France
Fencers at the 1900 Summer Olympics
Fencers from Paris
Olympic medalists in fencing
Medalists at the 1900 Summer Olympics